Urlaur Lough is a freshwater lake in the west of Ireland. It is located in east County Mayo and is one of the Urlaur Lakes.

Geography

Hydrology
Urlaur Lough is the source of the Lung River. The river flows to Lough Gara.

Natural history
Fish species in Urlaur Lough include perch, roach, pike, ninespine stickleback and the critically endangered European eel. Bird species at the lake include tufted duck, pochard, teal, mallard, whooper swan, wigeon and curlew. Urlaur Lough is part of the Urlaur Lakes Special Area of Conservation.

See also
List of loughs in Ireland

References

Urlaur